The band Far-Less has released three EPs and three full-length studio albums. They recorded a fourth EP "The Headache" in 2008 that was never officially released.

Emerge (2001) – self-released
Apossibility (2002) – self-released

Broken Hearts Unite

Track listing

Personnel
Brandon Welch – vocals
Jordan Powers –guitar
Mark Karsten – guitar
Joseph Powers – bass
Ray Felts – drums

Halo 13 – artwork
Jamie King – engineering, production
Jamie King – mixing

Turn to the Bright (EP)

Track listing

Personnel
Brandon Welch – vocals
Jordan Powers – guitar
Mark Karsten – guitar
Joseph Powers – bass
Ray Felts – drums

Asterik Studio – artwork
Jamie King – engineering/production
Jamie King – mixing
Coiln Patrick Day – photography

Everyone Is Out to Get Us

Track listing

Personnel
Brandon Welch – vocals
Jordan Powers – guitar
Mark Karsten –  guitar/piano
Joseph Powers – bass
Ray Felts – drums

Asterik Studio – artwork
Mastin Simmons – assistant engineer
Andy Riley – engineer
Lee March, Andy Riley – mixing
Lee March – producer
Mastin Simmons – programming
Jared Draughn (of Classic Case/Must Be The Holy Ghost) – guest vocals on "Roswell That Ends Well"

Inspired by [adult swim], Coast to Coast a.m, conspiracy documentaries, crop circles, and U.F.O sightings. Everyone is Out to Get Us is a concept album. The story of a young rock group on tour during the "Quickening" or the "Apocalypse". The album consists of two story lines that, at times exist within the same song. One story follows the band on tour and the insanity that they witness and the other follows a Govt. Whistleblower being hunted down by "The Powers That Be".

A Toast to Bad Taste

Track listing

Personnel
Brandon Welch – vocals, guitar
Jordan Powers – guitar, vocals 
Mark Karsten – guitar, vocals 
Joseph Powers – bass, vocals
Todd Turner – drums, vocals
Elizabeth "Bitsy" Pina – piano, synthesizer

Mike Green – producer
Josh King (from House of Fools) – guest vocals on "Forever and a Day" & "I Gave In"
Asha Mevlana – violin on "Gentlemen (Go to Sleep)" & "Forever and a Day"

Music video
A music video was also produced for the song "A Toast to Bad Taste".

The Headache EP Never released

References

Discographies of American artists
Rock music group discographies